Cimolestes (from Ancient Greek , 'chalk robber') is a genus of early eutherians with a full complement of teeth adapted for eating insects and other small animals. Paleontologists have disagreed on its relationship to other mammals, in part because quite different animals were assigned to the genus, making Cimolestes a grade taxon of animals with similar features rather than a genus of closely related ones. Fossils have been found in North America, South America, Europe and Africa. Cimolestes first appeared during the Late Cretaceous of North America. According to some paleontologists, Cimolestes died out at the start of the Paleocene, while others report the genus from the early Eocene.

Most species have been described from teeth and isolated fragments. One complete articulated skeleton provisionally assigned to Cimolestes has been found. It shows a small, agile, tree-dwelling predator with long toes for grasping branches and a prehensile tail at least twice the length of its body. It has the largest number of tail vertebrae known in any mammal.

Classification 
The genus was once considered to be marsupials; later it was reclassified with the placental mammals, as ancestors of the Carnivora and the extinct Creodonta. Recent researchers have agreed the species assigned to Cimolestes are primitive eutherian mammals, members of a Cimolestid clade (an order or family named after the genus), part of the larger clade Didelphodonta (a superorder or order, not to be confused with the marsupial clade Didelphimorphia). Didelphodonts have been placed within the Ferae, as a sister group to Carnivora. However, consensus is emerging that modern placental mammals evolved later than previously thought, that other types of mammals had long, diversified, and successful histories, and that Cimolestes and many related genera are stem eutherians, more closely related to placentals than to marsupials but outside of placental mammals proper, and not closely related to any living animal.

Cimolestes in particular follows as the direct outgroup to Taeniodonta, indicating that the latter evolved from forms similar to it.

Reassigned species 
In order to make the genus reflect an actual group of most closely related species, three nominal species of Cimolestes, C. magnus, C. cerberoides, and C. propalaeoryctes, have been reassigned to their own genera, Altacreodus, Ambilestes, and Scollardius, respectively. Cimolestes incisus Marsh and Cimolestes stirtoni Clemens remain within the genus.

Fossil distribution 
Fossils of Cimolestes have been found in:

Cretaceous
 Canada 
 Foremost, Oldman and St. Mary River Formations, Alberta
 Ravenscrag and Frenchman Formations, Saskatchewan
 United States
 Hell Creek and Judith River Formations, Montana
 Kirtland Formation, New Mexico
 Lance Formation, Wyoming

Paleocene
 Hainin Formation, Belgium 
 Santa Lucía Formation (Tiupampan), Bolivia
 Ravenscrag and Frenchman Formations, Saskatchewan, Canada
 Jbel Guersif Formation, Morocco
 United States (Puercan)
 Bear and Hell Creek Formations, Montana
 Ferris Formation, Wyoming

Eocene
 Fossil Butte Member, Green River Formation, Wyoming, United States

References 

Fossils of Canada
 
Prehistoric mammal genera
Cretaceous–Paleogene boundary
Cretaceous mammals of North America
Cretaceous Canada
Cretaceous United States
Hell Creek fauna
Paleocene mammals of Africa
Fossils of Morocco
Paleocene mammals of Europe
Paleogene Belgium
Fossils of Belgium
Paleocene mammals of North America
Paleogene Canada
Paleogene United States
Eocene mammals of North America
Campanian genus first appearances
Paleocene mammals of South America
Paleogene Bolivia
Tiupampan
Fossils of Bolivia
Fossil taxa described in 1889
Taxa named by Othniel Charles Marsh